Giovanni Scarantino (born 19 March 1966) is an Italian weightlifter. He competed at the 1988 Summer Olympics, the 1992 Summer Olympics and the 1996 Summer Olympics.

References

1966 births
Living people
Italian male weightlifters
Olympic weightlifters of Italy
Weightlifters at the 1988 Summer Olympics
Weightlifters at the 1992 Summer Olympics
Weightlifters at the 1996 Summer Olympics
People from Caltanissetta
Sportspeople from the Province of Caltanissetta
20th-century Italian people